Omar Al-Yaqoubi (born 3 July 1987) is an Omani association football referee who has been a full international referee for FIFA since 2013.

References

External links 
 

1987 births
Living people
Omani football referees